Wang Zheng (born January 1959) is a vice admiral (zhongjiang) of the People's Liberation Army (PLA) who has been director of the People's Liberation Army Navy Political Work Department since June 2018.

Biography
Wang was born in Jing County, Hebei, in January 1959. He served in various posts in People's Liberation Army Air Force before serving as director of Jinan Military Region Air Force Political Department in November 2014. In June 2018, was commissioned as director of the People's Liberation Army Navy Political Work Department.

He was promoted to the rank of vice admiral (zhongjiang) in June 2019.

References

1959 births
Living people
People from Jing County, Hebei
People's Liberation Army generals from Hebei